Achille Beltrame (18 March 1871 in Arzignano – 19 February 1945 in Milan), was an Italian painter and illustrator.

Biography
He initially studied in Vicenza, but then enrolled in the Brera Academy. In 1899, he began working as an illustrator for the newspaper Corriere della Sera and illustrated the La Domenica del Corriere of Milan. He pursued this task for nearly 50 years.
He was succeeded in this position by the illustrator Walter Molino.

Beltrame held his first solo exhibition at Ranzini Gallery in 1941 in Milan.

References

19th-century Italian painters
Italian male painters
20th-century Italian painters
20th-century Italian male artists
Painters from Milan
Brera Academy alumni
Italian illustrators
1871 births
1945 deaths
19th-century Italian male artists
People from Arzignano